Phytoecia atricollis is a species of beetle in the family Cerambycidae. It was described by Stephan von Breuning in 1954. It is known from the Democratic Republic of the Congo and Tanzania.

References

Phytoecia
Beetles described in 1954